Swayne's hartebeest (Alcelaphus buselaphus swaynei) is an endangered antelope native to Ethiopia. Two of the largest remaining populations are located in Senkelle Swayne's Hartebeest Sanctuary, Nechisar National Park and Maze National Park. It has been extirpated from Somalia. It is named after British officer H. G. C. Swayne (1860–1940).

When it comes to their population status, during the times before the early 1890s the Swayne's hartebeest was very common throughout Ethiopia and Somalia. The population then declined due to an epidemic that happened during the mid-1890s which brought about an extremely high mortality rate for wildlife and livestock which as a result were labeled as “in danger of extermination”. 

Swayne's hartebeest exhibits ecological differences from other subspecies of hartebeests in that they prefer grassland habitats during wet and dry seasons. It likes to select short grass areas of no more than 30 centimeters for feeding, and has a preference for burned grassland patches. The preference for burned grassland patches has become relevant in the development of effective conservation strategies for the subspecies (and potentially the whole species).

References 

Swayne's hartebeest
Mammals of Ethiopia
Endemic fauna of Ethiopia
Fauna of the Horn of Africa 
Swayne's hartebeest
Swayne's hartebeest